Doyle Bramhall II (born December 24, 1968) is an American guitarist, producer and songwriter best known for his work with Eric Clapton and Roger Waters. He is the son of the songwriter and drummer Doyle Bramhall.

Early life
Bramhall was born in Texas and lived half of his life in Northern California. His father, Doyle Bramhall Sr., played drums for the legendary bluesmen Lightnin' Hopkins and Freddie King and was a lifelong collaborator with his childhood friends Stevie Ray Vaughan and Jimmie Vaughan.

Career
When Bramhall was 18, he toured with Jimmie Vaughan's band the Fabulous Thunderbirds. 

He co-founded the blues rock band Arc Angels with Charlie Sexton and members from Stevie Ray Vaughan's rhythm section, Chris Layton and Tommy Shannon. 

He released his first solo album Doyle Bramhall II in 1996. 

Bramhall received phone calls from both Roger Waters and Eric Clapton following the 1999 release of Jellycream. Bramhall joined Waters on his In the Flesh tour, playing guitar and providing background and lead vocals. His performances were recorded on the subsequent live album and DVD In the Flesh – Live. Bramhall also played guitar on Clapton's Riding With the King, a collaboration with B.B. King. This album included Clapton's and King's songs and covers of blues songs (including two Bramhall-penned tracks originally from Jellycream.)

Bramhall released Welcome with his new band Smokestack in 2001. The album's lead single "Green Light Girl" was somewhat of a hit in the blues world. Bramhall and Smokestack released a live DVD entitled Live at the Great Wall of China in 2006. Two audio tracks from the DVD were released on iTunes as Doyle Bramhall II (Live at the Great Wall of China).

Bramhall has collaborated with artists such as T Bone Burnett, Elton John, Derek Trucks, Susan Tedeschi, Gary Clark Jr., Gregg Allman, Dr. John, Allen Toussaint, Billy Preston, Erykah Badu, Questlove and Meshell Ndegeocello.

Bramhall has produced several records including Sheryl Crow's 100 Miles from Memphis. He also joined her on a tour in 2011.

He was featured in the 2006 music industry documentary Before the Music Dies.

Bramhall co-produced Eric Clapton's 2013 release Old Sock and played guitars on his 2014 release The Breeze: An Appreciation of JJ Cale. He joined Clapton on his 50th anniversary tour as an opening act and backing musician. He appeared at Clapton's Crossroads Guitar Festival and was recorded for the subsequent live album and DVD. Bramhall played lead guitars on Elton John's 2013 album The Diving Board.

He played with the Tedeschi Trucks Band and Sharon Jones & the Dap Kings on the "Wheels of Soul" tour across the United States in 2015. He performed both as an opening act and as a rhythm guitarist in the Tedeschi Trucks Band, performing songs ranging from his days with the Arc Angels to unreleased songs. 

He performed a tribute concert to honor Joe Cocker along with the Tedeschi Trucks Band and alumni from the 1970 Joe Cocker Mad Dogs and Englishmen Tour including Leon Russell, Rita Coolidge, Bobby Torres, Claudia Lennear, Chuck Blackwell, Pamela Polland, Daniel Moore, Matthew Moore, Chris Stainton, and photographer Linda Wolf in 2015.  He also performed at the Mahindra Blues Festival in India alongside Buddy Guy and Quinn Sullivan in 2015.

Bramhall released his fourth studio album, titled Rich Man on September 30, 2016. This album consists of 12 originals and a cover of Jimi Hendrix's "Hear My Train A Comin'".

Bramhall signed with the Mascot Label Group in 2018 with expectations for a new album in the fall.  Entitled Shades, the album was planned to be released on October 5, 2018, following the lead single "Everything You Need", a duet with Eric Clapton. In addition to Clapton the album was to feature collaborations with Norah Jones, Greyhounds, and Tedeschi Trucks Band.

In 2022, the Arc Angels reformed for a small tour of the southern United States.

Style
Bramhall is one of the few guitarists who plays with his instrument strung upside-down. He plays left-handed but the instrument is strung upside-down with the high E on the top. This unusual arrangement of the strings gives his playing a unique sound because he bends the strings by pulling them downwards rather than upwards, the customary approach. Others who have bent strings in this direction include Elizabeth Cotton, Albert King, Eric Gales, Otis Rush, Barbara Lynn, Coco Montoya, Edgard Scandurra, Dick Dale, and the late blues guitarist Jeff Healey (who played with his instrument flat on his lap for stability and increased string flexibility).

Discography

1988 – Stu Blank – Under The Big Top
1990 – Marc Benno – Take It Back To Texas
1992 – Arc Angels – Arc Angels
1993 – Toni Price – Swim Away
1994 – Doyle Bramhall – Bird Nest On The Ground
1994 – Marc Benno – Snake Charmer
1996 – Doyle Bramhall II – Doyle Bramhall II
1998 – N'Dea Davenport – N'Dea Davenport
1999 – Doyle Bramhall II – Jellycream
1999 – Richie Kotzen – Break It All Down
1999 – Marty Grebb – Smooth Sailin'''
1999 – Meshell Ndegéocello – Bitter2000 – B.B. King & Eric Clapton – Riding with the King2000 – Roger Waters – In the Flesh – Live2000 – Indigenous – Circle2001 – Eric Clapton – Reptile2001 – Double Trouble – Been A Long Time2001 – Doyle Bramhall II – Welcome2001 – Neil Finn – One Nil2001 – Jennifer Warnes – The Well2002 – Roger Waters – Flickering Flame: The Solo Years Vol. 12002 – Sheryl Crow – C'mon, C'mon2002 – Lisa Marie Presley – To Whom It May Concern2003 – Boyd Tinsley – True Reflections2003 – Meshell Ndegéocello 
2003 – Comfort Woman
2003 – Doyle Bramhall – Fitchburg Street
2003 – Jack Casady – Dream Factor
2003 – B.B. King – Reflections
2003 – Chris Botti – A Thousand Kisses Deep
2004 – Eric Clapton – Me and Mr. Johnson
2004 – Eric Clapton – Sessions for Robert J
2004 – C.C. Adcock – Lafayette Marquis
2005 – Eric Clapton – Back Home
2005 – Bettye LaVette – I've Got My Own Hell to Raise
2005 – Susan Tedeschi – Hope and Desire
2005 – Various Artists – Our New Orleans: A Benefit Album for the Gulf Coast
2005 – Nerina Pallot – Fires
2005 – JJ Cale & Eric Clapton – The Road to Escondido
2006 – John Legend – Once Again
2007 – Doyle Bramhall – Is It News
2007 – Miles Davis – Evolution Of The Groove
2007 – Soundtrack – I'm Not There
2007 – Meshell Ndegéocello – The World Has Made Me the Man of My Dreams
2008 – Michael McDonald – Soul Speak
2008 – Amos Lee – Last Days at the Lodge
2008 – Susan Tedeschi – Back to the River
2008 – Rodney Crowell – Sex and Gasoline
2008 – Baby Animals – Il Grande Silenzio
2009 – Taylor Hicks – The Distance
2009 – The Derek Trucks Band – Already Free
2009 – Arc Angels – Living in a Dream
2010 – Robert Randolph and the Family Band – We Walk This Road
2010 – Eric Clapton – Clapton
2010 – Elton John/Leon Russell – The Union
2010 – Sheryl Crow – 100 Miles from Memphis
2011 – Gregg Allman – Low Country Blues
2011 – fDeluxe – Gaslight
2012 – Soundtrack – The Music Of Nashville: Season 1
2012 – Willie Nelson – Heroes
2013 – Tedeschi Trucks Band – Made Up Mind
2013 – Paul Allen & The Underthinkers – Everywhere At Once
2013 – Elton John – The Diving Board
2013 – Eric Clapton – Old Sock
2014 – Johnny Hallyday – Le Cœur D'Un Homme
2014 – Eric Clapton – The Breeze: An Appreciation of JJ Cale
2014 – Meshell Ndegéocello – Comet, Come to Me
2014 – Jerry Lee Lewis – Rock & Roll Time
2014 – Ruthie Foster – Promise Of A Brand New Day
2015 – James McMurtry – Complicated Game
2015 – Bettye LaVette – Worthy
2015 – David Ryan Harris – Lightyears
2015 – Paul Young – Tomb Of Memories (The CBS Years 1982–1994)
2015 – Buddy Guy – Born to Play Guitar
2016 – Tedeschi Trucks Band – Let Me Get By
2016 – Doyle Bramhall II – Rich Man
2016 – Eric Clapton – Live in San Diego
2016 – Eric Clapton – Crossroads Revisited: Selections from the Crossroads Guitar Festivals
2017 – Sheryl Crow – Be Myself
2017 – Grainne Duffy – Where I Belong
2018 – Meshell Ndegéocello – Ventriloquism
2018 – Boz Scaggs – Out Of The Blues
2018 – Ann Wilson – Immortal
2018 – Doyle Bramhall II – Shades
2019 – Gary Clark Jr. – This Land
2019 – Tedeschi Trucks Band – Signs
2019 – Reese Wynans – Sweet Release
2019 – Robbie Robertson – Sinematic
2021 – Tedeschi Trucks Band - Layla Revisited (Live at LOCKN')
2022 – Edgar Winter – Brother Johnny

Personal life

Bramhall was in a relationship with American actress and fellow native Texan Renée Zellweger from 2012 to 2019.

References

External links

Doyle Bramhall II website
ARC Angels official website

1968 births
Living people
Musicians from Dallas
American blues guitarists
American male guitarists
Guitarists from Texas
20th-century American guitarists
20th-century American male musicians
21st-century American guitarists
21st-century American male musicians